Don Wilson is a state representative from Monument, Colorado. A Republican, Wilson currently represents Colorado House of Representatives District 20, which includes a portion of unincporporated El Paso County and the communities of Air Force Academy, Black Forest, Gleneagle, Monument, Palmer Lake, and Woodmoor. Previously, Wilson served as the mayor of Monument, Colorado, and before that he served on the town's board of trustees. He is originally from Littleton, Colorado.

Appointment to the Colorado State House
Following the resignation of former district 19 state representative Tim Geitner on October 7, 2022, a vacancy committee met to select a replacement to fill out his term. However, the committee was unable to achieve a quorum before the 30-day deadline. In such cases, the governor is then required to appoint someone to fill out the term. Governor Jared Polis selected Wilson on November 9, 2022.

Election to the Colorado State House
In 2022, Wilson was a candidate for state house district 20, a new district established after 2020 reapportionment. In the 2022 elections, Wilson ran unopposed in both the primary and general elections. So when the Colorado General Assembly convened on January 9, 2023, Wilson finished his term in the former district 19 and began his term in the new district 20. The new district 20 is geographically smaller than the old district 19, but both include the town of Monument.

References

External links
 Legislative website
 Campaign website

21st-century American politicians
Living people
People from Monument, Colorado
People from Littleton, Colorado
Year of birth missing (living people)
Mayors of places in Colorado
Republican Party members of the Colorado House of Representatives